KOI-256 is a double star located in the constellation Cygnus approximately  from Earth. While observations by the Kepler spacecraft suggested the system contained a gas giant exoplanet orbiting a red dwarf, later studies determined that KOI-256 was a binary system composed of the red dwarf orbiting a white dwarf.

Name

The acronym "KOI" comes from Kepler object of interest and means that the object has been cataloged by the Kepler spacecraft during its search for extrasolar planets using the transit method. The "256" is the number of the object.

Characteristics
Further studies by Muirhead et al.

Muirhead et al. (2013) performed additional observations with the Hale Telescope at Palomar Observatory. Using the radial velocity method for exoplanet detection, Muirhead's team found that the red dwarf was wobbling too much to be caused by a planetary mass object, and was more likely being influenced by a white dwarf. Using ultraviolet data from the GALEX spacecraft, it was seen that the red dwarf was significantly active, further suggesting perturbations by a white dwarf. The team re-analyzed Kepler data, and found that when the white dwarf passed in front of the red dwarf, the red dwarf's light noticeably warped and brightened, an effect called gravitational lensing. While only being slightly larger than the Earth, the white dwarf has such large mass that the physically larger red dwarf orbits around its smaller companion.

References

Astronomical objects discovered in 2009
Cygnus (constellation)
Eclipsing binaries
256
J19004443
M-type main-sequence stars